High Street railway station is located on the Main Northern line in New South Wales, Australia. It serves the High Street area of Maitland opening on 27 May 1856.

High Street formerly had a wooden structure on the footbridge, however this was destroyed by fire in 1987 and replaced with a waiting shelter on the platform. Only the eastern half of the platform remains in use, with the western part fenced off.

Platforms & services
High Street has one island platform with two faces. It is serviced by NSW TrainLink Hunter Line services travelling between Newcastle, Maitland and Telarah. It is also serviced by one early morning service to Scone.

Transport links
Hunter Valley Buses operate four routes via High Street station:
181: Woodbury to Rutherford
183: Regiment Road to Tenambit
184: Maitland to Chambers Street
185: Maitland to Gresford

References

External links

High Street station details Transport for New South Wales

Maitland, New South Wales
Railway stations in the Hunter Region
Railway stations in Australia opened in 1856
Regional railway stations in New South Wales
Main North railway line, New South Wales